Triceratiales is an order of diatoms.

References

Coscinodiscophyceae
Diatom orders